Giovanni Schmidt ( in Livorno –  in Naples) was an Italian librettist.

Life
He moved to Naples while he was still young and stayed there for the rest of his life. Between 1800 and 1839 he wrote libretti for 45 operas, especially for the Teatro San Carlo for which he was the official poet. He and Andrea Leone Tottola were the two librettists who dominated theatrical life in Naples in the first quarter of the 19th century. His lyrics were mostly banal and verbose, but were set by the most important composers of the era, such as Giacomo Tritto, Gaetano Andreozzi, Luigi Mosca, Pietro Generali, Saverio Mercadante and Gioachino Rossini. For Rossini alone he wrote texts for Elisabetta, regina d'Inghilterra, Eduardo e Cristina, Armida and Adelaide di Borgogna, which are considered his best works. He also appeared as a character in a scene from the 1991 film Rossini! Rossini! directed by Mario Monicelli.

Works

Libretti
Meleagro (opera seria; music by Nicola Antonio Zingarelli, 1798)
Idante ovvero I sacrifici d'Eccate (dramma per musica; music by Marcos António Portugal, 1800)
Gli americani (opera seria; music by Giacomo Tritto; 1802)
Piramo e Tisbe (opera seria; music by Gaetano Andreozzi, 1803)
Leonora (dramma semiserio; music by Ferdinando Paer, 1804)
Cesare in Egitto (opera seria; music by Giacomo Tritto, 1805)
Andromeda (opera seria; music by Vittorio Trento, 1805)
Il salto di Leucade (music by Luigi Mosca, 1812)
Ecuba (tragedia per musica; music by Nicola Antonio Manfroce, 1812)
Elisabetta, regina d'Inghilterra (dramma; music by Gioachino Rossini, 1815)
Armida (dramma; music by Gioachino Rossini, 1817)
Adelaide di Borgogna (dramma; music by Gioachino Rossini, 1817)
Eduardo e Cristina (dramma; music by Gioachino Rossini, 1819)
L'apoteosi d'Ercole (dramma per musica; music by Saverio Mercadante, 1819)
Anacreonte in Samo (dramma per musica; music by Saverio Mercadante, 1820)
Lo sposo in provincia (commedia; music by Giacomo Cordella, 1821)
La sposa indiana (music by Pietro Generali, 1822)
L'amante virtuoso (music by Giuseppe Balducci, 1823)
Le nozze de' Sanniti (dramma per musica; music by Pietro Raimondi, 1824)
Alessandro nelle Indie (dramma per musica; music by Giovanni Pacini, 1824)
Anazilia (melodramma; music by Giovanni Pacini, 1825)
Malvina (music by Michele Costa, 1829)
Le nozze campestri (dramma per musica; music by Giacomo Cordella, 1840; music by Giuseppe Lillo, 1840)

Other works
Cimarosa agli Elisi (sonetto; music by Pietro Casella, 1801)

Bibliography
New Grove Dictionary of Music and Musicians (2000)
 Pacini, Giovanni: Le mie memorie artistiche (Firenze, 1865)
 Rescigno, Edoardo: Dizionario rossiniano (2002)

1775 births
1839 deaths
Year of birth uncertain
Year of death uncertain
Italian opera librettists
Italian people of Austrian descent
18th-century Italian writers
18th-century Italian male writers
19th-century Italian writers
19th-century Italian male writers
Writers from Naples